In Islamic theology, the term Ahl al-Fatrah, which literally means "people of the time period", refers to the people who lived during a gap in revelation between the times of the prophets Isa and Muhammad, approximately between 30 CE and 610 CE.

It can also refer in a general sense to everyone whom the da‘wah (invitation to Islam) has not reached in an uncorrupted manner and live in ignorance of the teachings of Islam. In Arabic the term used was "conveyance of the message".

Afterlife
Accordingly, the people of the period are judged differently on the Day of Judgement. There is a difference of opinion between scholars of Islam on their afterlife. The rationalist Mu'tazilites believed that each person would be legally responsible to reject polytheism and idolatry, and believe in an All-Powerful God. Failure to do so warranted damnation for eternity. The Ash'aris believed that those who did not receive the message would be forgiven, even idolaters. Their premise was that good and evil is based upon revelation; in other words, good and evil are defined by God. Therefore, in the absence of revelation, they cannot be held accountable.

Abu Hamid al-Ghazali categorized non-Muslims into three categories:

 1. People who never heard of the message, who live in far away lands, such as the Byzantines ("Romans"). These will be forgiven.
 2. People who were exposed to a distorted understanding of Islam and have no recourse to correct that information. These too will be forgiven.
 3. People who heard of Islam because they live in neighboring lands and mix with Muslims. These have no hope of salvation.

He also wrote about non-Muslims who have heard a distorted message: "The name of Muhammad has indeed reached their ears, but they do not know his true description and his character. Instead, they heard from the time they were young that a deceitful liar named Muhammad claimed to be a prophet. As far as I am concerned, such people are [excused] like those who the call of Islam has not reached, for while they have heard of the Prophet’s name, they heard the opposite of his true qualities. And hearing such things would never arouse one’s desire to find out who he was."

Imam Nawawi, an Ash'ari, said in his commentary Sharh Sahih Muslim that those who are born into idolatrous families and die without a message reaching them are granted paradise based upon the Qur'anic verse 17:15: "We do not punish a people until a messenger comes to them."

According to ibn Taymiyyah, these people who did not receive the message in this world will be tested in the next life.

Salafi view
Muhammad Nasiruddin al-Albani, a Salafi scholar, stated on this matter: “The term Ahl al-Fatrah refers to everyone whom the dawah (message of Islam) has not reached in a correct manner as it came in the Shariah… Such people will not be punished on the Day of Judgement [for their disbelief in this world]. It is quite possible for People of the Interval to exist in every time period, whether before [the revelation of the final message of] Islam or after. The message has to have reached them in its pristine purity, without any distortions. In cases where the dawah reaches people in a mutilated form in which its essential components; its fundamental principles of belief, have been substituted, I am the first to say that the dawah has not reached them.”

See also

References

External links
 "What if I never heard about Islam?," On Islam

Judgment in Islam
Islam and other religions
Islamic terminology